The Buel–Town Building is an historic structure located at 278 5th Avenue in San Diego's Gaslamp Quarter, in the U.S. state of California. It was built in 1898.

The Buel–Town Building was the first Gaslamp Quarter building to be rehabilitated, in 1973, kicking off the rejuvenation of this neighborhood near San Diego's downtown; from then it housed the Old Spaghetti Factory restaurant.

See also
 List of Gaslamp Quarter historic buildings

References

External links

 

1898 establishments in California
Buildings and structures completed in 1898
Buildings and structures in San Diego
Gaslamp Quarter, San Diego